Laila is a 1997 Maldivian drama film edited and directed by Abdulla Sujau. Produced by Aafathis, the film stars Aishath Shiranee, Moosa Zakariyya, Aishath Zeeniya, Ali Shameel and Mariyam Haleem in pivotal roles.

Premise
Laila, an attractive blind girl and the only child of a family, desires to meet her mother, Waheedha (Mariyam Haleem) who has been divorced during her childhood. Mueed (Moosa Zakariyya), a new recruit working at her father, Faiz's (Ali Shameel) office, visits her home upon Faiz's request and is instantly attracted to Laila. Their friendship grows into romance and complications arise when Laila's best-friend, Zeena, realizes her crush, Ahmed, is the same man posing with a different name, whom Laila is romantically linked up with.

Cast 
 Aishath Shiranee as Laila
 Moosa Zakariyya as Ahmed Mueed / Moosa
 Aishath Zeeniya as Zeena
 Ali Shameel as Faiz
 Ahmed Shimau as Nisham
 Fathimath Neena as Shahula
 Mariyam Haleem as Waheedha
 Zaneena Abdul Hakeem
 Fathuma Didi
 Aiminaidhee as Zeena's sister
 Aishath Hanim

Soundtrack

Accolades

References

1998 films
Maldivian drama films
1997 drama films
1997 films
1998 drama films
Dhivehi-language films